Uno Lauri Nurminen (26 January 1895 – 10 August 1972) was a Finnish trade union activist, civil servant and politician, born in Kärkölä. He served as a Member of the Parliament of Finland from 1924 to 1927, representing the Socialist Electoral Organisation of Workers and Smallholders. From 1929 to 1930, he was active in the short-lived Left Group of Finnish Workers. Later, he joined the Social Democratic Party of Finland (SDP) and was elected chairman of the Uusimaa district of the party.

References

1895 births
1972 deaths
Finnish trade unionists
People from Kärkölä
People from Häme Province (Grand Duchy of Finland)
Socialist Electoral Organisation of Workers and Smallholders politicians
Left Group of Finnish Workers politicians
Social Democratic Party of Finland politicians
Members of the Parliament of Finland (1924–27)